Biever House is a historic home located in Annville Township, Lebanon County, Pennsylvania. It was built in 1814, and is a -story, 5-bay wide limestone residence in a vernacular Georgian style.  It has a gable roof with dormers and a two-story, two-bay stone addition dated to the mid-19th century.  The addition has a two-story frame porch.

It was added to the National Register of Historic Places in 1978.  It is a contributing property in the Annville Historic District.

References

Houses on the National Register of Historic Places in Pennsylvania
Georgian architecture in Pennsylvania
Houses completed in 1814
Houses in Lebanon County, Pennsylvania
Historic district contributing properties in Pennsylvania
National Register of Historic Places in Lebanon County, Pennsylvania